George Wulweber was an English Protestant during the reign of Henry VIII.

He was imprisoned abroad and racked. He was described by the Christopher of Brunswick and Lunenburg, Archbishop of Bremen in 1536 as: a seditious person who had violently usurped the government of the town of Lübeck, imprisoned the old rulers, robbed the church, and promoted the Lutheran heresy; not satisfied with which, he had raised war in Denmark and Holstein to the Emperor's prejudice.

He was accused of being an Anabaptist, apparently falsely

References

Year of birth missing
Year of death missing
16th-century Protestants
16th-century English people